S.T.F.A. Lee Shau Kee College is located in 303 Kwai Shing Circuit, Kwai Chung, N.T., Hong Kong. It is managed by Shun Tak Fraternal Association.

History
It was originally an orphanage, namely Lee Ching Yee Child-care Centre. Later, sponsored by the honourable Lee Shau Kee GBM, the center was given enough funds to be transformed into a full-time school, setting the foundation of the later named S.T.F.A. Lee Shau Kee College. It was founded in 1978.

Principal

Former Principal (1978–1996): Dr Chui Hong Sheung. 崔康常 (Currently the President of Gratia Christian College)
Former Principal (1996–2012): Mr. Tsang Yat Ming. 曾日明
Principal (2012–2020): Mr. Tang Cheuk Chong 鄧卓莊
Current Principal (2020-): Ms. Cheung Hau Yan 張巧欣

Facilities
S.T.F.A. Lee Shau Kee College is the only Subsidized Secondary School in Kwai Chung and Tsuen Wan district having a swimming pool. Moreover, the school has the facilities down below:

Classrooms
Elevator

Ground Floor
Comprehensive court (can be used as basketball court, handball court and football field)
25m half standard swimming pool
Six 80m runway
Volleyball court
Yung Yau playground (can be used as badminton court and canteen)
Computer laboratory
Design and technology (carpentry workshop) room
Counselling room
Tuck shop

First Floor
Dancing room
Library (An isolated building built beside the main building)
Hall (can be used as badminton court and table tennis court, there is a classroom under the hall)
Art rooms
Music room

Second floor
Sky garden
Multimedia learning classroom (MMLC)
Home economics room

Third floor
Staff room

Fourth floor
Physics laboratory 
Experiment preparing room
Integrated science laboratory

Fifth floor
Chemical laboratory 
Experiment preparing room
Biology laboratory

Founder
Lee Shau Kee GBM (born 29 January 1928 in Shunde, Guangdong) is a property developer and majority owner of Henderson Land Development (HKSE:0012), a property conglomerate with interests in properties, hotels, town gas and internet services. He is currently the second wealthiest person in Hong Kong and Greater China Region, just after Li Ka Shing.

Other schools funded by S.T.F.A.
Shun Tak Fraternal Association Seaward Woo College
S.T.F.A. Leung Kau Kui College
S.T.F.A. Tam Pak Yu College

References

External links
 

Educational institutions established in 1978
Secondary schools in Hong Kong